Life Savers Building is a historic commercial and industrial building located on North Main Street between Horton and Wilkins Avenues at Port Chester, Westchester County, New York. It was built in 1920 and expanded in 1948–1949.  It served as a manufacturing facility and headquarters of the Life Savers Candy Company until 1984.  It is five stories high and constructed of reinforced concrete, brick, and terra cotta.  It features larger-than-life replicas of Life Savers rolls at the foundation line.  During its peak period of production in the 1960s, as many as 616 million rolls of Life Savers candy were produced each year in the facility. It was converted into a condominium complex in 1989.

It was added to the National Register of Historic Places in 1985. The larger than life replicas of Life Savers have since been removed.

Gallery

See also
National Register of Historic Places listings in southern Westchester County, New York

References

External links

Historical Treasures of Westchester County: Life Savers Building

Industrial buildings and structures on the National Register of Historic Places in New York (state)
Industrial buildings completed in 1920
Buildings and structures in Westchester County, New York
Port Chester, New York
National Register of Historic Places in Westchester County, New York
1920 establishments in New York (state)
Confectionery industry